The high sheriff is the oldest secular office under the Crown (prior to 1974 the office previously known as sheriff). Formerly the high sheriff was the principal law enforcement officer in the county but over the centuries most of the responsibilities associated with the post have been transferred elsewhere or are now defunct, so that its functions are now largely ceremonial.  The high sheriff changes every March.

This is a list of high sheriffs of Kent.

11th century to 14th century

15th century to 16th century

17th century to 18th century

19th century

20th century

Present century

Notes

References

 
Kent
Local government in Kent
High Sheriff of Kent